Peter J. Patton (born February 9, 1974) is a retired American basketball player in his third season as the Dallas Mavericks Shooting Coach hired under Mark Cuban. Patton is working closely with players such as Luka Doncic and Jalen Brunson. Patton was previously employed as the shooting coach for the Minnesota Timberwolves. Patton, himself was a three-year varsity starter in basketball, baseball, and football at Loyola Academy.  After the Chicago Catholic League, Patton received a scholarship to DePaul University.  While at DePaul, Patton was named captain of the 1995–96 team. Patton set the DePaul single season 3pt fg% record, a mark that still stands (54.1%). Patton remains in the top ten in DePaul Basketball history for assists, steals, and career three-pointers.  Peter trained with Chip Engelland, world-renowned shooting coach for the San Antonio Spurs. Peter went on to play professional basketball in the CBA, IBA, and two seasons in Europe.

References

1974 births
Living people
DePaul Blue Demons men's basketball players
Minnesota Timberwolves assistant coaches
American men's basketball players